Wing Commander John Scott Williams  (1893–1944) was a Canadian military officer and aviator. In 1921, he organized the Royal Canadian Air Force. Williams was born at Goldenville, Nova Scotia, in 1893. Williams died in a hospital in Montreal on 1 January 1944, age 51, after a lengthy illness.

References

1893 births
1944 deaths
Canadian military personnel killed in World War II
Canadian recipients of the Military Cross
Royal Air Force officers
Royal Canadian Air Force officers
Royal Canadian Air Force personnel of World War II
Royal Flying Corps officers
Canadian military personnel from Nova Scotia